Michael or Mike Keane may refer to:

 Michael Keane (economist) (born 1961), Plus Alliance Professor at UNSW Business School and King's College London
 Michael Keane (footballer, born 1982), former Irish footballer who played for St Patrick's Athletic
 Michael Keane (footballer, born 1993), English footballer who plays for Everton
 Michael Keane (governor) (1874–1937), British colonial administrator in India
 Mike Keane (born 1967), retired Canadian ice hockey player
 Michael Keane, a video game character in Grand Theft Auto IV
 Michael Keane, per historical anecdote, a blind Irish harp player at Fort Oswego

See also 
 Michael Keen (disambiguation)